Dominique Deruddere (born 15 June 1957) is a Belgian film director, actor, screenwriter and producer.

Career
Dominique Deruddere was an actor before he became a director.

Filmography

 Crazy Love (1987)
 Wait Until Spring, Bandini (1989)
 Suite 16 (1994)
 Everybody's Famous! (2000)
  (2005)
 Flying Home (2014)

References

External links

1957 births
Living people
People from Turnhout
Belgian film directors